APHC can stand for the following:

A Prairie Home Companion, US weekly radio program
All Parties Hurriyat Conference, a coalition of political parties in Kashmir
Andhra Pradesh High Court, the ultimate legal authority in that state of India
Anglo-Philippine Holdings Corporation, a Philippines financial consortium investing in mass-transit operations
Appaloosa Horse Club (ApHC), a US horse breeding organization
Armor-piercing hard core, a military designation for projectile types
Association of Plumbing and Heating Contractors, a trade association in England and Wales